The 2021–22 UEFA Women's Champions League qualifying rounds began on 17 August and ended on 9 September 2021.

A total of 68 teams competed in the group stage qualifying rounds of the 2021–22 UEFA Women's Champions League, which includes two rounds, with 46 teams in the Champions Path and 22 teams in the League Path. The 12 winners in the round 2 (seven from Champions Path, five from League Path) advanced to the group stage, to join the four teams that entered in that round.

Times are CEST (UTC+2), as listed by UEFA (local times, if different, are in parentheses).

Teams

Champions Path
The Champions Path included all league champions which did not qualify directly for the group stage, and consisted of the following rounds:
Round 1 (43 teams playing one-legged semi-finals, final and third place match): 43 teams which entered in this round.
Round 2 (14 teams): three teams which entered in this round and eleven winners of the round 1 finals.

Below are the participating teams of the Champions Path (with their 2021 UEFA club coefficients), grouped by their starting rounds.

League Path
The League Path includes all league non-champions and consists of the following rounds:
Round 1 (16 teams playing one-legged semi-finals, final and 3rd place match): 16 teams which enter in this round.
Round 2 (10 teams): 6 teams which enter in this round and 4 winners of the round 1 finals.

Below are the participating teams of the League Path (with their 2021 UEFA club coefficients), grouped by their starting rounds.

Format
Round 1 consisted of mini-tournaments with two semi-finals, a final and a third-place play-off hosted by one of the participating teams. If the score was level at the end of normal time, extra time was played, and if the same amount of goals were scored by both teams during extra time, the tie was decided by a penalty shoot-out. Round 2 was played over two legs, with each team playing one leg at home. The team that scored more goals on aggregate over the two legs advance to the next round. If the aggregate score was level at the end of normal time of the second leg, the away goals rule was no longer applied starting from this season. To decide the winner of the tie, extra time was played, and if the same amount of goals were scored by both teams at the end of normal time, the tie was decided by a penalty shoot-out. An additional preliminary round consisting of two-legged home-and-away matches would have been played by the champions from the lowest-ranked associations if more than 50 associations had entered the tournament and the title holders hadn't qualified through league position. Since only 50 associations entered, this round was skipped.

In the draws for each round, teams were seeded based on their UEFA club coefficients at the beginning of the season, with the teams divided into seeded and unseeded pots containing the same number of teams. Prior to the draws, UEFA may form "groups" in accordance with the principles set by the Club Competitions Committee, but they are purely for convenience of the draw and do not resemble any real groupings in the sense of the competition. Teams from associations with political conflicts as decided by UEFA may not be drawn into the same tie. After the draws, the order of legs of a tie could have been reversed by UEFA due to scheduling or venue conflicts.

Schedule
The schedule of the competition is as follows (all draws are held at the UEFA headquarters in Nyon, Switzerland).

Round 1

The draw for Round 1 was held on 2 July 2021, 13:00 CEST. The hosts of each tournament were selected after the draw. The semi-finals were played on 17 and 18 August, and the third-place play-offs and finals on 20 and 21 August 2021. The winners of the finals advanced to round 2.

Seeding
A total of 59 teams played in Round 1. They were divided into two paths:
Champions Path (43 teams): 43 teams which entered in this round.
League Path (16 teams): 16 teams which entered in this round.

Seeding of teams for the semi-final round was based on their 2021 UEFA club coefficients, with 22 seeded teams and 21 unseeded teams in the Champions Path, and 8 seeded teams and 8 unseeded teams in the League Path. Teams were drawn into two semi-finals within each four team group and, for the group with three teams, the team with the highest coefficient was given a bye to the final. In the semi-finals, seeded teams would be considered the "home" team for administrative purposes, while in the third-place play-offs and finals, the teams with the highest coefficients would be considered the "home" team for administrative purposes. Due to political reasons, teams from the following associations could not be drawn into the same group: Kosovo / Bosnia and Herzegovina; Kosovo / Serbia; Kosovo / Russia; Ukraine / Russia.

Champions Path

Tournament 1

Bracket

Hosted by Gintra Universitetas.

Semi-finals

Third-place play-off

Final

Tournament 2

Bracket

Hosted by Glasgow City.

Semi-finals

Third-place play-off

Final

Tournament 3

Bracket

Hosted by Osijek.

Semi-finals

Third-place play-off

Final

Tournament 4

Bracket

Hosted by SFK 2000.

Semi-finals

Third-place play-off

Final

Tournament 5

Bracket

Hosted by Åland United.

Semi-finals

Third-place play-off

Final

Tournament 6

Bracket

Hosted by Apollon Limassol.

Semi-finals

Third-place play-off

Final

Tournament 7

Bracket

Hosted by PAOK.

Semi-finals

Third-place play-off

Final

Tournament 8

Bracket

Hosted by Juventus.

Semi-finals

Third-place play-off

Final

Tournament 9

Bracket

Hosted by Twente.

The third place play-off between Peamount United and Tbilisi Nike was cancelled following a decision taken by the Dutch health authorities to put the whole team of Tbilisi Nike into quarantine after a player had tested positive for COVID-19. The result of the match was awarded by UEFA as a 3–0 win for Peamount United.

Semi-finals

Third-place play-off

Final

Tournament 10

Bracket

Hosted by Pomurje.

Semi-finals

Third-place play-off

Final

Tournament 11

Bracket

Hosted by Czarni Sosnowiec.

Semi-finals

Final

League Path

Tournament 1

Bracket

Hosted by Zürich.

Semi-finals

Third-place play-off

Final

Tournament 2

Bracket

Hosted by Kristianstad.

Semi-finals

Third-place play-off

Final

Tournament 3

Bracket

Hosted by Rosenborg.

Semi-finals

Third-place play-off

Final

Tournament 4

Bracket

Hosted by Lokomotiv Moscow.

Semi-finals

Third-place play-off

Final

Round 2

The draw for Round 2 was held on 22 August 2021, 13:00 CEST.

Seeding
A total of 24 teams play in Round 2. They were divided into two paths:
Champions Path (14 teams): 3 teams which entered in this round, and 11 winners of Round 1 (Champions Path).
League Path (10 teams): 6 teams which entered in this round, and 4 winners of Round 1 (League Path).
Seeding of teams was based on their 2021 UEFA club coefficients, with 7 seeded teams and 7 unseeded teams in the Champions Path, and 5 seeded teams and 5 unseeded teams in the League Path. Teams from the same association in the League Path could not be drawn against each other. The first team drawn in each tie would be the home team of the first leg.

Summary

The first legs were played on 31 August and 1 September, and the second legs on 8 and 9 September 2021. 

The winners of the ties will advance to the group stage.

|+Champions Path

|}

|+League Path

|}

Champions Path

Køge won 3–0 on aggregate.

Breiðablik won 4–1 on aggregate.

Juventus won 3–0 on aggregate. 

Benfica won 5–1 on aggregate.

Zhytlobud-1 Kharkiv won 5–2 on aggregate.

Servette Chênois won 3–2 on aggregate.

BK Häcken won 6–3 on aggregate.

League Path

Lyon won 4–2 on aggregate.

Arsenal won 7–0 on aggregate.

Real Madrid won 2–1 on aggregate.

5–5 on aggregate. VfL Wolfsburg won after penalties.

1899 Hoffenheim won 6–3 on aggregate.

References

External links

Fixtures and Results, 2021–22, UEFA.com

1
August 2021 sports events in Europe
September 2021 sports events in Europe